is a Japanese actor.

Career
Ayano was featured in several roles beginning in 2003. In 2009, he appeared in Takashi Miike's Crows Zero 2. His role in the film was described by Mark Schilling of The Japan Times as "a tall, pale-faced, delicately featured boy who looks like Michael Jackson's Japanese cousin, but fights like Bruce Lee." He was later cast in Shun Oguri's directorial debut, Surely Someday (2010).

Ayano co-starred in Takefumi Tsutsui's In a Lonely Planet (2011) with Aya Takeko and Takayo Mimura. He appeared in Mika Ninagawa's Helter Skelter (2012), and had supporting roles in Eriko Kitagawa's I Have to Buy New Shoes (2012) and Shuichi Okita's Yokomichi Yonosuke (2013).

In 2013, Ayano starred in two of his highest profile roles to date: as George "Joe" Asakura in Gatchaman, a live-action adaptation of the classic Tatsunoko Productions anime, and as Ishikawa Goemon in Lupin III, adapted from the iconic manga by Monkey Punch and directed by Ryuhei Kitamura.

In 2016, Ayano was cast as the lead character, Nyx Ulric, in the feature film Kingsglaive: Final Fantasy XV.

Filmography

Film

Television

Awards
2013
 Tokyo Drama Award 2013: Best Supporting Actor for Saikō no Rikon
 The 37th Japan Academy Prize: Newcomer of the Year for A Story of Yonosuke and Natsu no Owari

2014
 The 38th Elan d'or Award for Newcomer of the Year
 The 22nd Hashida Award: Best Newcomer for Saikō no Rikon, Sora Tobu Kōhōshitsu and Yae no Sakura
 The 36th Yokohama Film Festival: Best Actor for The Light Shines Only There
 The 88th Kinema Junpo Best 10: Best Actor for The Light Shines Only There and The Snow White Murder Case
 The 69th Mainichi Film Award for Best Actor for The Light Shines Only There

2015
 The 7th Tama Cinema Forum: Best Actor for Shinjuku Swan, Piece of Cake, The Big Bee, Soredake/That's It and S: Saigo no Keikan

2016
 The 15th New York Asian Film Festival: Rising Star Award
 The 41st Hochi Film Award: Best Supporting Actor

References

External links
 Official website
 

Japanese male television actors
1982 births
Living people
Male actors from Gifu Prefecture
21st-century Japanese male actors
Japanese male models
Japanese male film actors
Models from Gifu Prefecture